Morris "Mace" Alvin Neufeld (July 13, 1928 – January 21, 2022) was an American film and television producer.

Life and career
Neufeld was born July 13, 1928, in New York City, New York, the son of Margaret Ruth (née Braun) and Philip M. Neufeld, a stockbroker. He graduated from Yale University. He married Helen Katz in 1954, and has three children, Bradley, Glenn and Nancy.

In the 1950s, Neufeld became a talent agent and managed Don Knotts, Don Adams, Randy Newman, Neil Diamond, Jim Croce and Jay Ward. Neufeld entered television series production in the late 1970s.  His productions of the time included the variety show The Captain and Tennille, which ran from 1976 to 1977 on ABC, The Kids from C.A.P.E.R., which ran from 1976 through 1977 on CBS, and Quark, which ran for one year in 1978 on NBC. He also became a film producer, beginning with The Omen in 1976, along with its sequels. Neufeld next produced the TV-movie Angel on My Shoulder on ABC 1980, as well as the features The Frisco Kid (the first of several film projects with Harrison Ford) in 1979, The Funhouse in 1981, and Transylvania 6-5000 in 1985. Neufeld's small screen work continued, including a 1981 family drama American Dream and the fantasy of The Magic Planet (both on ABC), as well as White Hot: The Mysterious Murder of Thelma Todd on NBC and the adventure of Lightning Force, a syndicated series, from 1991 to 1992.

His production company, with mogul Marvin Davis, was followed by one set up with Robert Rehme, which arranged an exclusive production deal with Paramount. Launching their partnership in the early 1990s, the team went on to shepherd Patriot Games and Clear and Present Danger, based on the bestselling books of Tom Clancy. They also produced 1991's Flight of the Intruder. Neufeld had earlier produced Clancy's The Hunt for Red October with Jerry Sherlock. When Rehme exited the partnership to become President of the Academy of Motion Picture Arts and Sciences, Neufeld went on to produce yet another Tom Clancy adaptation starring Ben Affleck, The Sum of All Fears, as well as Bless the Child, Lost in Space and Asylum.

Neufeld produced Jack Ryan: Shadow Recruit, starring Chris Pine, and Tom Clancy's Jack Ryan, starring John Krasinski, as well as The Equalizer and Equalizer 2, both starring Denzel Washington. Neufeld was given the Lifetime Achievement Award at the 2014 Israel Film Festival.

Neufeld died in Beverly Hills, California, on January 21, 2022, at the age of 93.

Filmography
He was a producer in all films unless otherwise noted.

Film

As an actor

Thanks

Television

As writer

As an actor

References

External links

Mace and Helen Katz Neufeld Collection, Bryn Mawr College Art and Artifact Collections

1928 births
2022 deaths
Film producers from New York (state)
Stuyvesant High School alumni
Television producers from New York City
Yale University alumni